Kylla Liisa Sjoman (born 18 August 1987) is a former Canadian footballer from Burnaby, British Columbia. She played for SK Slavia Prague and Celtic L.F.C. of the Scottish Women's Premier League. She has also represented the Canada women's national soccer team at senior international level, making her debut against England in April 2013.

Early life
Sjoman was born in New Westminster to Pentti and Julie Sjoman. Her father is a Finn from Kajaani, and she also has Finnish citizenship.

Club career
A versatile left-sided player with joint Canadian–Finnish citizenship, in 2010 Sjoman signed a deal to play for Doncaster Rovers Belles while living at the Ramada Jarvis hotel in Doncaster with Áine O'Gorman and Maria Karlsson.

After a spell in Germany, Sjoman signed for Celtic in August 2013. She returned to Herforder SV in February 2014.

In January 2016, Sjoman left Celtic for Sunderland and was happy to be back in the FA WSL: "The set up here at Sunderland is the most professional environment I have experienced since coming overseas and the players and staff have made it an easy transition for me."

International career
Sjoman returned to South Yorkshire in April 2013 with the Canadian national team, making her senior national team debut in a 1–0 friendly defeat to England at New York Stadium in Rotherham.

See also

 Foreign players in the FA WSL

References

External links
Sjoman at Doncaster Rovers Belles LFC
Sjoman at Ottawa Fury
Sjoman at Arizona Sun Devils

Living people
Doncaster Rovers Belles L.F.C. players
Celtic F.C. Women players
1987 births
Canadian people of Finnish descent
Canadian expatriate soccer players
Canadian expatriate sportspeople in Germany
Canadian women's soccer players
Canada women's international soccer players
Women's association football midfielders
Women's Super League players
Soccer people from British Columbia
Expatriate women's footballers in Germany
Expatriate women's footballers in Scotland
Expatriate women's footballers in England
Sunderland A.F.C. Ladies players
Arizona State Sun Devils women's soccer players
Expatriate women's footballers in the Czech Republic
Canadian expatriate sportspeople in the Czech Republic
Canadian expatriate sportspeople in Scotland
Canadian expatriate sportspeople in England
SK Slavia Praha (women) players
Czech Women's First League players
Ottawa Fury (women) players
USL W-League (1995–2015) players
Boston Renegades players